Kokopo/Vunamami Rural LLG is a local-level government (LLG) of East New Britain Province, Papua New Guinea.

Wards
01. Karavi
02. Vunamami
03. Bitarebarebe
04. Vunabalbal
05. Gunanba
06. Tinganavudu
07. Malakuna
08. Ulagunan
09. Livuan
10. Ramale
11. Bitagalip
12. Kabakaul
13. Takubar
14. Palnakaur
15. Ulaulatava
16. Vunapope
17. Ngunguna
18. Gunanur
19. Palavirua
20. Vunamami No.2
80. Kokopo Town

References
Notes

Bibliography

Local-level governments of East New Britain Province